The 1962–63 NBA season was the Nationals' 14th season in the NBA. In their final season in Syracuse, the Nationals finished with a record of 48–32, good enough for 2nd place in the NBA Eastern Division.  They qualified for the playoffs but lost to the Cincinnati Royals, 3 games to 2 in the East semifinals.

Following this season, the Nationals relocated to Philadelphia and became the 76ers, filling the void left by the Warriors, who moved to the Bay Area the prior year.

Regular season

Season standings

x – clinched playoff spot

Record vs. opponents

Game log

Playoffs

|- align="center" bgcolor="#ccffcc" 
| 1
| March 19
| Cincinnati
| W 123–120
| Hal Greer (32)
| Hal Greer (11)
| Costello, Greer (6)
| Onondaga War Memorial4,335
| 1–0
|- align="center" bgcolor="#ffcccc" 
| 2
| March 21
| @ Cincinnati
| L 115–133
| Chet Walker (24)
| Johnny Kerr (12)
| Larry Costello (3)
| Cincinnati Gardens3,205
| 1–1
|- align="center" bgcolor="#ccffcc" 
| 3
| March 23
| Cincinnati
| W 121–117
| Lee Shaffer (34)
| Johnny Kerr (17)
| Hal Greer (7)
| Onondaga War Memorial8,007
| 2–1
|- align="center" bgcolor="#ffcccc" 
| 4
| March 24
| @ Cincinnati
| L 118–125
| Lee Shaffer (32)
| Johnny Kerr (14)
| Larry Costello (5)
| Cincinnati Gardens3,331
| 2–2
|- align="center" bgcolor="#ffcccc" 
| 5
| March 26
| Cincinnati
| L 127–131 (OT)
| Lee Shaffer (45)
| Johnny Kerr (20)
| Paul Neumann (6)
| Onondaga War Memorial7,418
| 2–3
|-

Awards and records
Hal Greer, All-NBA Second Team

References

Philadelphia 76ers seasons
Syracuse
Syracuse
Syracuse